The 2019 World Junior Wrestling Championships were the 43rd edition of the World Junior Wrestling Championships and were held in Tallinn, Estonia between 12 and 18 August 2019.

Medal table

Team ranking

Medal summary

Men's freestyle

Men's Greco-Roman

Women's freestyle

References 

World Wrestling Junior Championships
World Junior Wrestling Championships